'Frederick Henry "Frecky" Elliott' (February 18, 1903 – August 28, 1982) was a professional ice hockey player who played 43 games in the National Hockey League with the Ottawa Senators during the 1928–29 season (while on loan from the Montreal Maroons who owned his rights). The rest of his career, which lasted from 1927 to 1931, was spent in various minor leagues. Elliott was born in Clinton, Ontario.

Career statistics

Regular season and playoffs

1923-24 Owen Sound Greys Canadian Junior Championship team
1924-25 Minneapolis Millers (with Owen Sound Greys teammate Ralph Cooney Weiland

External links 
 

1903 births
1982 deaths
Canadian ice hockey right wingers
Ice hockey people from Ontario
London Panthers players
London Tecumsehs players
Niagara Falls Cataracts players
Ottawa Senators (1917) players
People from Huron County, Ontario
Philadelphia Arrows players
Place of death missing
Stratford Nationals players
Toronto Falcons (CPHL) players
Windsor Bulldogs (1929–1936) players